The year 1613 in science and technology involved some significant events.

Astronomy
 Galileo Galilei publishes Letters on Sunspots, the first major work on the topic.

Paleontology
 Bones, probably of an elephant, are found in France but at first interpreted to belong to a giant human.

Technology
 September 29 – The New River (engineered by Sir Hugh Myddelton) is opened to supply London with drinking water from Hertfordshire.

Births
 March 6 – Stjepan Gradić, Ragusan polymath (died 1683)
 September 25 – Claude Perrault, French architect and physicist (died 1688)

Deaths
 June 16 – Jakob Christmann, German orientalist and astronomer (born 1554)
 July 2 – Bartholomaeus Pitiscus, German trigonometrist (born 1561)
 August 25 – David Gans, German Jewish mathematician and astronomer (born 1541)
 Mathew Baker, English shipwright (born 1530)
 Johann Bauhin, Swiss physician and botanist (born 1541)
 Jacques Guillemeau, French surgeon (born 1550)

References

 
17th century in science
1610s in science